The following lists events that happened in 2008 in Armenia.

Incumbents
 President: Robert Kocharyan (until 9 April), Serzh Sargsyan (starting 9 April)
 Prime Minister: Serzh Sargsyan (until 9 April), Tigran Sargsyan (starting 9 April)

Events

January
 January 18 - Armenian-Americans urge the restoration of Section 907 of the Freedom Support Act in wake of Azeri war talk.
 January 18 - Armine Ohanyan, senior editor of the "Zhamanak Yerevan" daily is sacked for posting information that "was balanced but not always sympathetic" to former Armenian president-turned opposition candidate Levon Ter-Petrosyan.

February
 February 20 - Prime Minister Serzh Sargsyan is elected as President in a contest hailed as largely democratic by OSCE and international monitors.

March
 March 1 - 2008 Armenian presidential election protests
 Armenian President Robert Kocharyan declares a state of emergency following political unrest in Yerevan.
 Eight people have been killed in the post-election unrest between Armenian authorities and the opposition.
 March 3 - Armenian police have arrested 30 opposition activists accused of causing political unrest.
 March 4 - Georgian President Mikheil Saakashvili has expressed "his support to the people and authorities of Armenia".

August
 August 8-24 - 25 athletes from Armenia competed at the 2008 Summer Olympics in Beijing, China.

References

 
2000s in Armenia
Armenia
Armenia
Years of the 21st century in Armenia
Armenia